Morris Kay (born July 31, 1932) was an American politician in the state of Kansas. A Republican, he served in the Kansas House of Representatives.

Kay was born in St. John, Kansas and attended primary schooling there while helping his father on the family farm. He attended the University of Kansas, where he played college football, captaining the 1953 Kansas Jayhawks football team. He also served in the United States Army. He was later an insurance executive. Kay was the Republican candidate for Governor of Kansas in the 1972 gubernatorial election, losing to incumbent Governor Robert Docking. At that time he was serving as majority leader of the Kansas House of Representatives. From January 1979 to June 27, 1982, he served as the Kansas Republican Party chairman.

References

1932 births
Living people
People from St. John, Kansas
Kansas Jayhawks football players
Republican Party members of the Kansas House of Representatives
State political party chairs of Kansas
20th-century American politicians